Life After Dark is the fourth studio album by New Zealand-born singer Mark Williams. The album was his first on the CBS Records label and released in 1979.

Track listing
LP/Cassette (SBP 237330)

Personnel
 Mark Williams - lead vocal
 Cos Russo - keyboard
 Mark Punch - guitar, backing vocal
 Phil Lawson - bass
 Peter Figures - drums
 Adrian Scott - keyboards
 Brenton White - guitar
 John Kemp - guitar
 Brian Hamilton - bass
 Jackie Orszaczky - bass
 Perry Johnston - drums
 Sunil da Silva - percussion
 Joe Tattersal - percussion
 Boof Thompson- trumpet
 Keith Stirling - trumpet
 Geoff Oakes - saxophone
 Alan Galbraith - backing vocal
 Sheryl Black - backing vocal
 Maggie McKinney - backing vocal
 Shauna Jensen - backing vocal
 Mary Bradfield - backing vocal
 Ron Barry - backing vocal

References

1979 albums
CBS Records albums
Mark Williams (singer) albums